Wael Kamel Gomaa El Hawty (born 3 August 1975) is an Egyptian retired professional footballer who played as a centre-back. He is regarded as one of the best African defenders of all time.

Club career
Gomaa's performances with Ghazl El Mahalla in the 2000–01 season earned him a move to Al Ahly after the Egypt Cup final match with Ghazl El Mahalla against Al Ahly.

He made his debut for Al Ahly in a friendly match against Real Madrid in August 2001. His official debut was in the match against Angolan side Petro Atletico in CAF Champions League 2001 on 12 August in Luanda.

He is known for his passing accuracy and the ability to score from corners and free kicks. He can also score powerful headers, as evidenced by his goal in the CAF Champions League 2008 final against Cotonsport Garoua of Cameroon.

In the 2006–07 season, he had pre-season trials with Blackburn Rovers with a view to a January transfer.

In week 23 of the 2010–11 season, in his 200th appearance for Al Ahly in the Egyptian Premier League, he conceded a penalty for Haras El Hodoud which Ahmed Abdel-Ghani missed.

In February 2014, Gomaa announced that he would retire from football at the end of the season. In May 2014, he confirmed that he officially retired from football. He won 26 trophies with Al Ahly including six CAF Champions League titles. He won 113 caps for Egypt, helping the Pharaohs clinch three Africa Cup of Nations titles.

International career
Gomaa made his international debut on 26 April 2001 in a friendly match against South Korea.

He was pivotal in the Egypt national team's African Cup of Nations in 2006, 2008 and 2010. He appeared in every match for the Egyptian side in both tournaments, defending against top European league players such as Drogba, Eto'o, Manucho and Lomana LuaLua.

Gomaa was chosen by CAF in Best Africa XI three times, in 2006, 2008 and 2010.

Gomaa participated with Egypt in FIFA Confederations Cup and appeared in every match for the Egyptian side. He made his 100th International appearance for Egypt when Egypt played against Uganda on 8 January 2011 in the 2011 Nile Basin Tournament. During the tournament he scored his only international goal, against Kenya in the semi final. Egypt went on to win the match 5–1.

Post-retirement advertising
In March 2014, Gomaa starred in a Coca-Cola advertisement that saw him get a lot of praise for his good spirit as he acted numerous different characters that had a chance to go to the FIFA World Cup with Coca-Cola after Egypt failed to qualify for the tournament. The ad received a lot of praise for its creativity and had widely received positive reviews.

Honours
Al Ahly
 Egyptian Premier League: 2004–05, 2005–06, 2006–07, 2007–08, 2008–09, 2009–10, 2010–11, 2013–14
 Egypt Cup: 2003, 2006, 2007
 Egyptian Super Cup: 2003, 2005, 2006, 2007, 2008, 2010, 2012
 CAF Champions League: 2001, 2005, 2006, 2008, 2012, 2013
 CAF Super Cup: 2002, 2006, 2007, 2009, 2013

Egypt
 African Cup of Nations: 2006, 2008, 2010

Individual
 CAF Team of the Year: 2005, 2008, 2009, 2010
 World Military Cup best player: 2001

See also
 List of men's footballers with 100 or more international caps

References

External links
 
 

1975 births
Living people
Egyptian Muslims
Egyptian footballers
Egyptian expatriate footballers
Al Ahly SC players
Egypt international footballers
2009 FIFA Confederations Cup players
2002 African Cup of Nations players
2004 African Cup of Nations players
2006 Africa Cup of Nations players
2008 Africa Cup of Nations players
2010 Africa Cup of Nations players
Africa Cup of Nations-winning players
Association football defenders
Expatriate footballers in Qatar
Al-Sailiya SC players
FIFA Century Club
Egyptian Premier League players
Qatar Stars League players
Egyptian expatriate sportspeople in Qatar
People from Gharbia Governorate